Tapinoma wheeleri is a species of ant in the genus Tapinoma. Described by William M. Mann in 1935, the species is endemic to Samoa.

References

Tapinoma
Endemic fauna of Samoa
Insects described in 1935